Rosalia de Souza is a Brazilian bossa nova singer. She was born in Nilópolis, Rio de Janeiro, Brazil, an area famous for its samba school, Beija-Flor.

After travelling to Italy at the age of 21, she began to study music theory, Cuban percussion, and jazz at the Scuola Popolare di Testaccio (Popular school of Testaccio) in Rome.

Discography

Albums
 Garota Moderna (2003)
 Garota Diferente (Schema, 2004)
 Brasil Precisa Balançar (Schema, 2008)
 D'Improvviso (Schema, 2009)
Tempo (2018) (Nau Records -NAU1328)

Singles & EPs
Maria Moita (2002)
Samba Novo / Bossa 31 (2004)
Fica Mal Com Deus / Canto De Ossanha (2004)
Zona Sul / Maria Moita (2004)
Adriana / Saudosismo (2004)
Jogo De Roda (2005)
Que Bandeira (2006)
Rio De Janeiro (2006)

Compilations
Novo Esquema da Bossa (1995)
Today’s Sound (1997)
Hommage (2002)

References

External links
 Rosalia de Souza in concert
 Rosalia De Souza discography at Discogs

1966 births
Living people
Bossa nova singers
Brazilian jazz singers
Música Popular Brasileira singers
Samba musicians
People from Nilópolis
20th-century Brazilian women singers
20th-century Brazilian singers
21st-century Brazilian women singers
21st-century Brazilian singers

es:Rosalia De Souza#top